Świdnica is a city in south-western Poland in the region of Silesia. As of 2021, it has a population of 55,413 inhabitants. It lies in Lower Silesian Voivodeship, being the seventh largest town in that voivodeship. It is the seat of Świdnica County, and also of the smaller district of Gmina Świdnica (although it is not part of the territory of the latter, as the town forms a separate urban gmina). Świdnica became part of the Wałbrzych agglomeration on 23 January 2014.

Świdnica is home to the St. Stanislaus and St. Wenceslaus Cathedral and the Church of Peace, two landmark churches listed as Historic Monuments of Poland with the latter also listed as a UNESCO World Heritage Site.

History

The city's name was first recorded as Svidnica in 1070, when it was part of Piast-ruled Poland. Świdnica became a town in 1250, although no founding document has survived that would confirm this fact. The town belonged at the time to the Duchy of Wrocław, a province of Poland. By 1290, Świdnica had city walls and six gates, crafts and trade were blossoming. At the end of the 13th century, there were guilds of bakers, weavers, potters, shoemakers, furriers and tailors in Świdnica. The city was famous for its beer production. In the late 15th century, almost three hundred houses had the right to brew beer. In various cities of the region (Wrocław, Oleśnica, Brzeg) and Europe (Kraków, Toruń, Prague, Pisa) there were so-called "Świdnica Cellars" – restaurants serving beer from Świdnica. Wrocław's Piwnica Świdnicka exists to this day as the oldest restaurant in Poland and one of the oldest in Europe. There was also a mint in Świdnica. The Franciscans and Dominicans settled in the city in 1287 and 1291, respectively.

In 1291–1392 Świdnica was the capital of the Piast-ruled Duchy of Świdnica and Jawor. The last Polish Piast duke was Bolko II of Świdnica, and after his death in 1368 the duchy was held by his wife until 1392; after her death it was incorporated into the Kingdom of Bohemia by Wenceslaus IV of Bohemia. By the end of the 14th century, Świdnica was already one of the largest cities in Silesia, with about 6,000 inhabitants.

In 1429 the city successfully defended itself against a Hussite attack. From about 1469 to 1490 it was under the rule of the Kingdom of Hungary and after that it was part of Jagiellonian-ruled Bohemia. In the 15th century, several mills operated in the city. Large cattle and hop markets took place there. In 1493, the town is recorded by Hartmann Schedel in his Nuremberg Chronicle as Schwednitz.

In 1526 the city came under the rule of the Habsburg monarchy as part of the surrounding Duchy of Schweidnitz (Świdnica). In the 16th century it was one of the regional centers of Anabaptism. The city suffered greatly during the Thirty Years' War (1618–48) as a result of sieges, fires and epidemics. Świdnica, under the Germanized name Schweidnitz, was annexed by the Kingdom of Prussia during the First Silesian War (1740–42). The town was turned into a fortress, which it remained until 1866.

It was captured again by Austria in October 1761, during the Third Silesian War, or Seven Years' War, but Prussians retook it one year later. In 1803 the city was visited by Polish jurist, poet, political and military activist Józef Wybicki, best known as the author of the lyrics of the national anthem of Poland. In 1807 the city was captured by French troops during the Napoleonic Wars. It became part of the Prussian-led German Empire in 1871 during the unification of Germany and stayed within Germany until the end of World War II. According to the Prussian census of 1905, the city of Schweidnitz had a population of 30,540 who were mostly Germans, but also included a Polish minority comprising around 3% of the population. The World War I flying ace Lothar von Richthofen was buried in Schweidnitz, until the city became owned by Poland after World War II in which the graveyard was leveled. A Nazi prison was located in the city under Nazi Germany, and during World War II, the Germans also established a subcamp of the Gross-Rosen concentration camp, three prisoner of war labor divisions of the Stalag VIII-A camp and a forced labour camp. Among the prisoners was Lesław Bartelski, Polish writer and resistance member, who fought in the Warsaw Uprising.

After the defeat of Germany in 1945, the town, like most of Silesia, became part of Poland under border changes agreed at the Potsdam Conference. Those members of the German population who had not already fled or had been killed during the war were subsequently expelled to the remainder of Germany in accordance with the Potsdam Agreement and the city was repopulated with Poles, many of whom had themselves been expelled from Polish areas annexed by the Soviet Union. Also Greeks, refugees of the Greek Civil War, settled in Świdnica in the 1950s. From 1975 to 1998 it was administratively located in the former Wałbrzych Voivodeship.

In 2004, Świdnica became the seat of the Roman Catholic Diocese of Świdnica.

Points of interest

The Gothic Cathedral of St. Stanislaus and St. Wenceslaus from the 14th century has the highest tower in Silesia, standing 103 meters tall; it hosts an image of "Our Lady Health of the Sick". It is listed as a Historic Monument of Poland.

The Evangelical Church of Peace, a UNESCO World Heritage Site and Historic Monument of Poland, was built in 1656–57.

The 16th-century town hall has been renovated numerous times and combines Gothic, Renaissance, and Baroque architectural elements. A museum is located in the town hall. The Baroque Church of St. Joseph and the Church of St. Christopher are from the same era. One remaining element of the former defensive works is the Chapel of St. Barbara.

Other notable destinations include the old town and the Stary Rynek square, Gola Dzierżoniowska Castle, Medieval town of Niemcza, Cistercian monastery at Henryków, where the oldest preserved manuscript in Polish was written, and the Wojsławice Arboretum.

Politics

Wałbrzych constituency
Members of Parliament (Sejm) elected from the Wałbrzych constituency.

Education
Świdnica is home to a College of Data Communications Technology (Wyższa Szkoła Technologii Teleinformatycznych).

In 2003, Świdnica hosted a session of the Warsaw-based International Chapter of the Order of Smile, when a Child Friendship Centre was established. Świdnica was officially titled the "Capital of Children's Dreams".

Sport
Polonia Świdnica – football club that competes in the lower leagues, but also played in the Polish second division in the 1940s and 1950s.
 Akademia Piłkarska 13 Jarosława Lato

Notable people

 Thomas Stoltzer (–1526), composer
 Maria Cunitz (1604–1664), astronomer
 Benjamin Schmolk (1672–1737), composer, poet
 Johann Christoph Glaubitz (–1767 in Vilnius) architect
 Johann Gottlieb Janitsch (1708–1763), composer
 Karl Theodor Robert Luther (1822–1900), astronomer
 Albert Kretschmer (1825–1891), professor, painter, costumes researcher
 Emil Krebs (1867–1930), sinologist
 Ferdinand Friedensburg (1886–1972), politician
 Michael Graf von Matuschka (1888–1944), resistance fighter
 Hubert Schmundt (1888–1984), Kriegsmarine Admiral 
 Manfred von Richthofen (1892–1918), World War I ace known as "The Red Baron"
 Peter Adolf Thiessen (1899–1990), physical chemist
 Heinz Starke (1911–2001), politician, Bundesfinanzminister 1961–1962
 Georg Gärtner (1920–2013), known as "Hitler's last Soldier in America"
 Gunther Gebel-Williams (1934–2001), animal trainer
 Manfred Kanther (born 1939), politician
 Henning Eichberg (born 1942), cultural sociologist
 Dorota Świeniewicz (born 1972), volleyball player, member of Poland women's national volleyball team
 Bartosz Huzarski (born 1980), cyclist
 Anna Werblińska (born 1984), volleyball player, member of Poland women's national volleyball team
 Janusz Gol (born 1985), Polish professional footballer
 Arkadiusz Piech (born 1985), Polish professional footballer
 Patryk Klimala (born 1998), Polish professional footballer
 Aleksander Balcerowski (born 2000), basketball player

Gallery

Twin towns – sister cities

Świdnica is twinned with:

 Biberach an der Riss, Germany
 Ivano-Frankivsk, Ukraine
 Kazincbarcika, Hungary
 Nizhyn, Ukraine
 Police nad Metují, Czech Republic
 Švenčionys, Lithuania
 Trutnov, Czech Republic
 Tendring, United Kingdom

Notes

References

External links

 Silesia Map of 1600s with Town of Schweidnitz in Duchy of Schweidnitz
 Website of the municipality of Świdnica
 Jewish Community in Świdnica on Virtual Shtetl
 Peace Church Panoramic view

 

 
Cities and towns in Lower Silesian Voivodeship
Świdnica County
Former principalities